Belgian DJ and record producer duo Dimitri Vegas & Like Mike released their first compilation album in 2014. "Mammoth" was their first single to chart in four countries. "Tremor" with Martin Garrix became their most successful single so far as it has charted in five countries, their only song to achieve this.

Albums

Compilation albums

Soundtrack albums

Extended plays

Singles

Charted singles

Notes

Non-charted singles

Dimitri Vegas solo singles
2021
 "Pull Me Closer" [House of House]
2022
 "The Drop" (with David Guetta, Nicole Scherzinger and Azteck) [Smash the House]

Like Mike solo singles
2010
 "Es Vedra" [Spinnin' Records]

2018
 "Memories" [Smash The House]
 "Rewind" [Smash The House]
 "Back 2 U" [Smash The House]

2019
 "Paralyzed" (featuring Ricky Hil) [Self-released]
 "A.M." [Self-released]
 "Best Friend" (featuring Bhavi) [Self-released]
 "Lies" [self-released]
 "Stuck In The Melody" [Self-released]
 "Sinner" [Self-released]

2020
 "High Off Love" (featuring Angemi) [Green Room]
 "Put Your Lips" [Green Room]
 "Pineapple" [Poporis Dimitrios]
 "I Lose Me" (featuring Layton Greene) [Green Room]
 "Best for You" [Green Room]

2021
 "We Come One" (with Angemi) [Smash The House]

2022
 "Desire" [Smash The House]

as 3 Are Legend (with Steve Aoki)
2019
 "Khaleesi" (with W&W) [Ultra Music]
2020
 "Raver Dome" (with Justin Prime and Sandro Silva)
"Deck the Halls" (with Toneshifterz, Brennan Heart and Timmy Trumpet)

Remixes

Dimitri Vegas solo remixes
2019
 Dimitri Vegas & Like Mike and Paris Hilton — "B.F.A. (Best Friend's Ass)" (Dimitri Vegas and Ariel Vromen Remix) [Smash The House]
 Dimitri Vegas & Like Mike, Bassjackers and 2WEI — "Mortal Kombat Anthem" (Dimitri Vegas and 2WEI Mortal Kombat 11 Trailer Mix) [Smash The House]

2021
 Dino Warriors and Julian Perretta — "Ayo Technology" (Dimitri Vegas Edit) [Smash The House]
 Ilkay Sencan and Vintage Culture featuring Yoelle — "Superpowers" (Dimitri Vegas Edit) [Smash The House]

3 Are Legend remixes
2018
 Dimitri Vegas & Like Mike and W&W – "Crowd Control" (3 Are Legend Remix) [Smash The House]

Music videos

Notes

References

Electronic music discographies
Discographies of Belgian artists
Discographies of Greek artists